The third series of The Great British Sewing Bee began on 5 February 2015 and aired for 6 episodes. Claudia Winkleman returned to present alongside resident judges May Martin and Patrick Grant. The series was filmed at Metropolitan Wharf in London.

Sewers

Results and elimination

Colour key
 Sewer got through to the next round
 Sewer was eliminated
 Sewer won best Garment of the week
 Sewer was the series runner-up
 Sewer was the series winner

Episodes

 Sewer eliminated   Best Garment  Winner

Episode 1

Episode 2: Attention to Detail Week: Children's Clothes

Episode 3: 1950s Week

Episode 4: Structure Week

Episode 5 – Semifinal: Tricky Fabrics

Episode 6: Final

Runner-up Lorna died of aplastic anaemia in early 2016. The first episode of series four was dedicated to her memory.

Ratings
All ratings are taken from BARB.

References

2015 British television seasons
The Great British Sewing Bee